Adenomera lutzi is a species of frog in the family Leptodactylidae. It is endemic to Guyana. First described from the upper Potaro River based on specimens collected before 1905, it is now known from a number of sites around the Pakaraima Mountains in west-central Guyana. The specific name lutzi honors Adolfo Lutz, a Brazilian medical entomologist and parasitologist and a pioneer of herpetology. Common names Lutz's tropical bullfrog and Lutz's thin-toed frog have been coined for the species.

Description
Adult males measure  and adult females  in snout–vent length. The snout is sub-elliptical when seen above and rounded-acute in profile. The canthus rostralis is rounded. The tympanum is distinct. The toe tips are expanded into small discs but lack circummarginal grooves. The forearms bear tubercles, and the lower surface of tarsus has distinct, white-tipped tubercles. The dorsal coloration is highly variable, and there are five major forms: (1) dark brown, grey or black ground color without or with a barely discernible pattern, (2) light–medium grey ground color with a well-defined pattern (a strongly marked dark brown–black inter-orbital bar and post-orbital ridges; chevron between shoulders almost continuous with round lumbar spots and irregular dark brown–black markings on the back), (3) as (2) but light grey, brown or reddish brown ground color and lighter, smaller, and much less evident/absent markings on the back, (4) similar to (2) but with dark brown to black mottling instead of well-defined markings on the back, and (5) dark grey to black ground color with large orange–orangish brown oblique lateral stripe, possibly with discernible darker markings. Most specimens have a white stripe that passes from the eye to the arm insertion, sometimes partly encompassing the tympanum. A narrow, yellow mid-dorsal stripe is often present but may be intermittent. The posterior surfaces of thighs are black with distinct yellow, orange, or red spotting or mottling. Males have yellow to orangish yellow throats and bellies. Vocal sac is internal.

Reproduction
Kok and colleagues hypothesize that males use their shovel-shaped snouts to excavate underground nesting chambers. Reproduction takes place during the wettest part of the year—excavation of egg chambers requires wet soils. The male advertisement call is a sequence of regular notes repeated about 17–23 times per minute. The dominant frequency is about 3300–3600 Hz. Female fecundity is 3–10 eggs.

Habitat and conservation
It is a primarily nocturnal that lives in and on leaf litter. Reproduction does not depend on bodies of water.

This species can be locally common. There are no known threats to it. It occurs in an area of undisturbed remote forest, and it is also known from the Kaieteur National Park.

References

lutzi
Endemic fauna of Guyana
Amphibians of Guyana
Amphibians described in 1975
Taxonomy articles created by Polbot